Karimabad (also Romanized as Karīmābād; also known as Karīmābād-e Kūh Yakhāb) is a village in Kuh Yakhab Rural District, Dastgerdan District, Tabas County, South Khorasan Province, Iran. At the 2006 census, its population was 108, in 21 families.

References 

Populated places in Tabas County